Howard Morris Clark (born August 23, 1935) is a former American football player who played with the Los Angeles / San Diego Chargers. He played college football at the University of Tennessee at Chattanooga.

References

1935 births
Living people
American football tight ends
Chattanooga Mocs football players
Los Angeles Chargers players
San Diego Chargers players
Players of American football from Georgia (U.S. state)
People from Dalton, Georgia
American Football League players